Arlene J. Chai (born 1955) is a Filipino-Chinese-Australian  author.

Biography
Arlene J. Chai was born in 1955 in Manila, Philippines.
She is Filipino by birth, Chinese by ethnicity and migrated to Australia with her parents and sisters in 1982 because of the political upheaval. She became an advertising copywriter at George Patterson's advertising agency in 1972 and has been working there since. It is there that she met her mentor Bryce Courtney, who continuously inspires her to improve her work. She graduated with a Bachelor of Arts degree from Maryknoll College. She is infamous for her ability to weave the political struggle of the Philippines so well into her fiction, so much that she is often compared with Isabel Allende, a successful magical realist Chilean novelist. Some of her works are her novels: The Last Time I saw my Mother and Eating Fire and Drinking Water.

Awards
She won the Louis Braille Adult Audio Book of the year for her novel On the Goddess Rock in 1999.

References

External Links 
 Arlene J. Chai | Penguin Random House
 Arlene J. Chai : The Last Time I Saw Mother : Book Review
 Arlene J. Chai | AustLit: Discover Australian Stories

1955 births
Living people
Filipino women novelists
Filipino novelists
Filipino emigrants to Australia
Filipino people of Chinese descent
Australian women novelists
Australian people of Chinese descent
20th-century Australian novelists
20th-century Australian women writers
Miriam College alumni